RMS Rangitiki was a passenger liner owned by the New Zealand Shipping Company. Rangitiki was built by John Brown & Company at Clydebank, Scotland and launched on 27 August 1928.

Service history
Ordered in 1927, Rangitiki was launched in 1928 and entered service with the New Zealand Shipping Company in 1929 sailing between Great Britain and New Zealand on the route via the Panama Canal.

At the start of the Second World War the ship was used for transporting children from Britain to Australia before being converted into a troopship.

Returned to service between Britain, Australia and New Zealand in 1945 the Rangitiki carried numerous servicemen home from Britain as well a number of war brides. Following an extensive refit in 1947–48 the ship was then used by the New Zealand Shipping Company and continued in service until July 1962 when after 87 peacetime return voyages between Britain and New Zealand it was withdrawn. Sold for scrap, Rangitiki sailed to Spain and was broken up in Valencia in October 1962.

Modifications in service
Both before and after its maiden voyage the ship was found to have stability issues especially when sailing in ballast so modifications including reducing the height of the ship by removing most of the bridge deck, shortening the funnels and adding more permanent ballast were made.

At the same time passenger capacity was reduced to 405.

References

1928 ships
Passenger ships of the United Kingdom
Ships built on the River Clyde
Ships of the New Zealand Shipping Company
Troop ships of the United Kingdom
World War II merchant ships of the United Kingdom